The Pakistan national cricket team toured England in 2003 for a three-match series of One Day Internationals, which was named the 2003 NatWest Challenge. England won the series 2–1, winning the final two matches after Pakistan won the first match at Old Trafford.

Squads

Richard Johnson withdrew from the England squad on 13 June and was replaced by James Kirtley. Faisal Athar withdrew from the Pakistan squad on 14 June and was replaced by Abdul Razzaq.

ODI series

1st ODI

2nd ODI

3rd ODI

Further reading
 Playfair Cricket Annual
 Wisden Cricketers Almanack

References

External links
 Tour home at ESPNcricinfo

2003 in Pakistani cricket
2003
International cricket competitions in 2003
2003 in English cricket